Momar Njie (born 26 August 1975 in Nianija) is a former Gambian footballer.

Njie gained 4 caps for his native Gambia during his playing career and is currently the co-trainer of Berlin-Liga side SV Tasmania Berlin.

References

External links 
 

1975 births
Living people
Gambian footballers
Serer sportspeople
The Gambia international footballers
Association football defenders
Tennis Borussia Berlin players
Borussia Fulda players
SV Yeşilyurt players
Füchse Berlin Reinickendorf players
BFC Preussen players
Gambian expatriate footballers
Expatriate footballers in Germany
Expatriate footballers in Austria